Aphonomorphini is a tribe of crickets in the subfamily Hapithinae. There are about 6 genera and more than 90 described species in Aphonomorphini.

Genera
These six genera belong to the tribe Aphonomorphini:
 Aenigmaphonus Gorochov, 2010
 Aphonomorphus Rehn, 1903
 Eneopteroides Chopard, 1956
 Idiotrella Gorochov, 2002
 Paraphonus Hebard, 1928
 Spiraphonus Gorochov, 2010

References

Further reading

 
 

Crickets
Orthoptera tribes